Frank Terletzki (born 5 August 1950) is a German football coach and former player of BFC Dynamo.

Early life
Frank Terletzki grew up in East Berlin. He came to football relatively lately, after his father Karlheinz had brough him to local side SG Prenlauer Berg at the age of ten. Terletzki was then allowed to join the youth department of football club BFC Dynamo in 1966. His father had wanted to see him at 1. FC Union Berlin, but Terletzki went to BFC Dynamo, as that meant a shorter distance to training.  His first coach at BFC Dynamo was Herbert Schoen. Schoen was described as a "tough dog" by Terletzki. Terletzki claims he learned important virtues such as discipline and toughness towards oneself from Schoen. Terletzki said: "It didn't matter to us whether it was pouring rain or snowing, we always trained."

Playing career

Club career
Terletzki made his first appearance with the first team of BFC Dynamo in the first leg of the round of 16 of the 1969-70 FDGB-Pokal against F.C. Hansa Rostock on 29 November 1969. He then made his debut for BFC Dynamo in the DDR-Oberliga away against  FC Karl-Marx-Stadt in the 15th mach day of the 1969-70 DDR-Oberliga on 27 March 1970. Terletzi retired from his professional career after the 1985–86 season. Altogether, he made 373 appearances in the DDR-Oberliga and scored 91 goals in the league for BFC Dynamo. He is one of the most capped player for BFC Dynamo. Terletzki served as team captain for many years and celebrated eight league titles in a row with BFC Dynamo. Terletzki is today an honorary captain at BFC Dynamo.

International career
Terletzki made four appearances and scored one goal for the East Germany national football team. He was selected to the East German Olympic team than won the silver medal in the 1980 Summer Olympics. He played all six matches in the tournament and scored three goals. Together with his teammates, he was awarded the Patriotic Order of Merit in bronze the same year.

Retiring from football
BFC Dynamo was affiliated to SV Dynamo. The players of BFC Dynamo nominally employees of the Volkspolizei or the Stasi. Terletzki was a member of the Volkspolizei, but released for football. After retiring as a fotball player, he decided to pursue a career in the police. The Volkspolizei sent him on patrol duty in Section 43 in Wannsee. Terletzki then decided to begin education to become a real police officer. In order become a police officer, he first had to attend the police academy in Biesdorf for three years. Terletzki eventually began his career as a police officer after German reunification. Terlezki had completeted appenticeship as a mechanical engineer at the VEB Machine Tool Building Combine "7 Oktober" in East Berlin. As a police office, he has worked as a clerk for weapons and equipment at the police armoury in Section 42 in Schöneberg.

Coaching career
Terletzi eventually returned to football as a coach. He joined SV Germania 90 Schöneiche as a coach in 1996. His time at SV Germania 90 Schöneiche was successful. SV Germania 90 Schöneiche achieved promotion from the Landesliga to the Brandenburg-Liga in the 1999-00 season. 

Terletzki left SV Germania 90 Schöneiche for FSV Wacker Fürstenwalde in 2000. He then took over MSV 19 Rüdersdorf in 2001, together with the former 1. FC Union Berlin player Günter "Jimmy" Hoge. Under Terletzki and Hoge, MSV 19 Rüdersdorf achieved promotion from the Bezirksliga to the Landesliga in the 2001-02 season. 

Terletzki left MSV 19 Rüdersdorf in 2007. He then became coach of TSG Rot-Weiß Fredersdorf-Vogelsdorf in the Kreisliga Märkisch-Oderland. He eventally left TSG Rot-Weiß Fredersdorf-Vogelsdorf to become the coach of the reserve team of the FSV Bernau in the Kreisliga Barnim at the beginning of 2013. Terletzki then coached TSG Rot-Weiß Fredersdorf-Vogelsdorf a second time in the 2019-20 season.

Personal life
Terletzki lives in Schöneiche in Brandenburg and still plays football. He now plays football for the Hertha BSC oldies.

Gallery

References

External links
 Career stats
 

1950 births
Living people
Footballers from Berlin
People from East Berlin
German footballers
East German footballers
Footballers at the 1980 Summer Olympics
Olympic footballers of East Germany
Olympic silver medalists for East Germany
Berliner FC Dynamo players
East Germany international footballers
Olympic medalists in football
Medalists at the 1980 Summer Olympics
DDR-Oberliga players
Recipients of the Patriotic Order of Merit in bronze
Association football midfielders